Eileen Myles (born December 9, 1949) is a LAMBDA Literary Award-winning American poet and writer who has produced more than twenty volumes of poetry, fiction, non-fiction, libretti, plays, and performance pieces over the last three decades. Novelist Dennis Cooper has described Myles as "one of the savviest and most restless intellects in contemporary literature." The Boston Globe described them as "that rare creature,  a rock star of poetry." In 2012, Myles received a Guggenheim Fellowship to complete Afterglow (a memoir), which gives both a real and fantastic account of a dog's life. Myles uses they/them pronouns.

Life and career

Early life and education 
Eileen Myles was born in Cambridge, Massachusetts, on December 9, 1949, to a family with a working-class background. They attended Catholic schools in Arlington, Massachusetts, and graduated from UMass Boston in 1971.

Myles moved to New York City in 1974 with the intention of becoming a poet. In New York they participated in writing workshops held at St. Mark's Poetry Project, which promoted the idea of the "working artist." There they studied with Alice Notley, Ted Berrigan, Paul Violi, and Bill Zavatsky, and were given a template for creating art in the context of community. There, Myles first met the poet Allen Ginsberg, whom they admired and who became the subject of several of their poems and essays. In 1979 they worked as an assistant to the poet James Schuyler.

Artistic director of St. Mark's 
In 1984 Myles was hired as the artistic director of St. Mark's Poetry Project, and held that position until 1986. They have stated their time there gave them the opportunity to rethink the institution that influenced their early work. During Reagan's presidency, 1981–1988, Myles dealt with the cuts to the NEA art budget and focused their energies on broadening the aesthetic and cultural range of the St. Mark's Poetry Project. Myles' leadership of the Project represented a generational shift away from the church's base, which until then been run by the second generation members of the New York School. Program Coordinators in this period were Patricia Spears Jones, and Jessica Hagedorn, and Myles invited Alice Notley and Dennis Cooper to teach. Charles Bernstein ran the lecture series, Chris Kraus, Marc Nasdor, and Richard Elovich coordinated performance, Tim Dlugos and James Ruggia edited the Newsletter. During their tenure at St. Mark's, Myles performed their now well-known poem "An American Poem" for the first time at P.S. 122.

Politics and teaching 
At the beginning of the 1991–1992 presidential election, Myles heard George H. W. Bush speak about the threat to freedom of speech posed by the dialog of activists and minoritized people. With that statement, Myles "realized there was this amazing political power to speech." Myles then conducted an "openly female" write-in campaign for the office of President of the United States from the East Village that spiraled into a project of national interest. Part performance art, part protest, this gesture was meant to offer an alternative glimpse into what progressive, radical, and socially committed politics could look like.
 Zoe Leonard's 1992 poem, "I want a president", which begins with the line: "I want a dyke for president", was written to celebrate Myles's presidential run.

Beginning in 2002, Myles began a five-year stint as a Professor of Writing at the University of California, San Diego (UCSD). UCSD funded the research and travel grant that enabled the creation of Inferno (2010), as well as Hell, an opera composed by Michael Webster, for which Myles wrote the libretto. Since leaving UCSD in 2007, Myles has been a Visiting Writer at Bard College, Jack Kerouac School of Disembodied Poetics at Naropa University, Washington University in St. Louis, University of Montana-Missoula, Columbia University School of the Arts, and New York University.

In 2016, Myles endorsed Hillary Clinton for president in a BuzzFeed piece entitled Hillary Clinton: The Leader You Want When The World Ends. Myles was also approached by Clinton's campaign to write a poem, as part of "Artists for Hillary", a mostly-female group which included Jenny Holzer and Maya Lin, whose creative statements were testament to their support for Clinton's presidential bid. Myles's poem was entitled MOMENTUM 2016.

Written works

Poetry 

By their own account, Myles moved from Boston to New York in 1974 "to be a poet," where they became associated with a group of poets at St. Mark's Poetry Project. Myles's first book, The Irony of the Leash, was published by Jim Brodey from the St. Mark's Poetry Project in 1978.

In 1977 and 1979, Myles published issues of dodgems, a literary magazine, a title referring, in the vernacular of Great Britain, to bumper cars, specifically those of Revere Beach, MA. The title is said to serve as a metonym for the collision of aesthetic differences that characterized the poetry scene of that time. The dodgems issues featured poems by John Ashbery, Barbara Guest, Charles Bernstein, as well as a letter from Lily Tomlin and an angry note from a neighbor; both issues are referenced in the book, A Secret Location on the Lower East Side—Adventures in Writing: 1960–1980, (which also describes St. Mark's), and were exhibited in vitrines in the Library's 1998 show on the same subject.

Myles's next collection, A Fresh Young Voice From the Plains (1981), earned their first major review, by Jane Bosveld in Ms. Not Me (1991) is Myles's most popular collection of poetry. It contains Myles work, "An American Poem," in which they fictionalize their identity and claims to be a "Kennedy", and comfortably addresses politics in the work. They first performed the work at P.S. 122 in New York City, during their tenure at St. Mark's. Since then "An American Poem" has been filmed and shown in film festivals all over the world, screening in New York and other major cities. It has been included, in translation, in German, Russian, and Italian anthologies of American writing. The trajectory of "An American Poem" is documented in Myles's novel Inferno (2010).

Myles produced Maxfield Parrish/early and new poems (1995), a collection of both new and selected poems on the theme of the surreality of sex. In the same year, Myles co-edited The New Fuck You: Adventures in Lesbian Reading (1995) with Liz Kotz, which is described as having a multi-genre approach and postmodern focus on reading rather than identity, and which is said to have offered something different from mainstream gay and lesbian poetry anthologies of the 1990s. Soon after, School of Fish (1997) appeared, the first work wherein Myles's dog, Rosie is featured, where Rosie served as a second camera in the poem's field of vision.

Myles published Skies (2000), a project begun in Provincetown, Massachusetts, where the poet described the sky becoming "a new character in my life." The book is framed by a transcript of a panel at The Schoolhouse Gallery in Provincetown, Massachusetts featuring Helen Miranda Wilson, Frances Richard, John Kelly, Molly Benjamin, and Jack Pierson, who each spoke about their own relation to the sky. On My Way (2001) concludes with an essay about speech and class, "The End of New England."

Snowflake / Different Streets (2012) uses the technique of dos-à-dos binding to combine two distinct collections of poetry in the same physical book. As Ian Bodkin writes in his review of the work, Myles' poems "navigat[e] the ever-insular landscape of our technological culture that invades moments of quiet thought" in Snowflake, then "offers a sense of return to the people and places of intimacy, connections that bring her back to this world" in different streets.

Non-fiction 
Though Myles's primary intention was to be a poet, they have stated that they were also moved by the New Journalism of the sixties and seventies and the art writing tradition by poets of the New York School. In the 1980s, Myles began to publish personal journalism, book reviews, and art reviews. Early columns appeared in the Poetry Project Newsletter; their essay "I Hate Mimeo" called for an end to the same publishing format in which their essay appeared. In the 1990s they wrote a monthly column in Paper.

Myles' early book and theater reviews appeared in New York Native, Outweek, and Out, and they were a notable figure on the poetry and queer art scene of the 1980s and 1990s on the Lower East Side. Later, Myles would publish essays and other article in the Village Voice, The Nation, Artforum, Parkett, and Art in America.

In 2006 Myles received an Warhol/Creative Capital grant, which funded their first collection of nonfiction, The Importance of Being Iceland: Travel Essays in Art (2009). The title essay from this collection, "Iceland," has been described as part travel essay, part personal essay, and part inquiry into the nature of how landscape and writing affect each other.

Fiction 

Myles's first collection of stories, Chelsea Girls (1994), features "Bread and Water," the oldest story in the collection, and an account of life in the East Village in the late 1970s and early 1980s. Raymond Foye called it "The quintessential memoir of the Lower East Side." In an interview with Michael Hafford, Myles stated that "Bread and Water"  "was literally like a copy of my life at that moment." In "Chelsea Girls," the title story, Myles chronicles their time as the assistant to poet James Schuyler in the Chelsea Hotel; their intergenerational exchange has been the subject of scholarship by Dianne Chisholm and José Esteban Muñoz.

Myles's second full-length work, Cool for You: a nonfiction novel (2000), catalogs abject institutional spaces of an "insider", in opposition to the male artist as an "outsider". Among these spaces are school, family, and various bad jobs; the extreme insider of the book is Myles's maternal grandmother Nellie Riordan Myles, who spent the last 17 years of her life in a state mental hospital in Massachusetts. Also included in Cool for Yous inventory is an imaginary one—a chapter that describes the solar system from the perspective of a ten-year-old version of Myles themself, Myles's first foray into fantasy writing. Cool for You received widespread recognition and was reviewed in The New York Times and The Nation.

Inferno (a poet's novel) (2010) fictionalizes the life of a poet very similar to Myles, and Myles stated in an interview with John Oakes that the vernacular language of Dante's "The Inferno" is their "biggest argument for the way I write." It was awarded a 2011 Lambda Literary Award for Lesbian Fiction. On September 29, 2015, HarperCollins reissued Myles's out-of-print novel, Chelsea Girls.

Performance 
In 1979 Myles founded the Lost Texans Collective with Elinor Nauen and Barbara McKay. That year the group produced Joan of Arc a spiritual entertainment and would produce Patriarchy, a play in 1980.

Later solo performances include "Leaving New York (1989), Life (1991), and Summer in Russia (1996), which were performed at P.S. 122, Judson Church.

Myles's later plays, Feeling Blue parts 1, 2, and 3, Modern Art, and Our Sor Juana Ines de la Cruz, written for Alina Troyano, were all produced at WOW Cafe and P.S. 122.

Since the early eighties Myles has toured and read their own work extensively. In late 1988 they traveled with poet and memoirist Jim Carroll on a tour sponsored by Lila Acheson Wallace. In the nineties Myles toured Germany with Kathy Acker, Lynne Tillman, Richard Hell, and Chris Kraus. Since 1997 Myles has frequently toured with LGBT performance group Sister Spit.

Myles appears on three episodes in the second season of the TV series Transparent in 2015.

Critical reception 
Myles's first book, The Irony of the Leash (1978), was produced on the mimeograph machine at St. Mark's Poetry Project.

Pulitzer prize-winning poet John Ashbery has described Myles's work as making one "uncomfortable and awake ... chanting softly and beautifully the harsh if humorous realities that combine to make whatever life a poet can piece together today." They have been called "a cult figure to a generation of post-punk female writer-performers" by Holland Cotter of The New York Times.

In a recent review of Snowflakes/different streets in the LA Review of Books, Brian Teare complicates these readings of Myles's persona in relation to their body of writing:

Inferno has been described by Craig Epplin as representing,

In a review of Chelsea Girls in The Los Angeles Times, Erika Taylor wrote:Myles' collection of short stories is so unabashedly solipsistic, so confident in its own self-absorption, that she takes chances and has payoffs few other writers would be willing to risk. . . It would be easy to dismiss "Chelsea Girls" as poetic hot air if Myles weren't so smart and funny. Somehow, she manages to hold our attention in spite of the closed-in quality of her work. This is writing with big courage, big talent and a big self-image. It would be really interesting to see what Myles might do facing the world instead of the mirror.

Charles Shipman, in a review of Cool for You in The St. Louis Post-Dispatch, wrote:Although the writing is sometimes too fragmented to follow and occasionally becomes a tad melodramatic (oh, those awful nuns!), Myles has an undeniable gift for capturing the small details and mundane events that shape our lives. She's also capable of writing with tremendous sensitivity, and because she never slips into sentimentality, her tender passages are all the more affecting. . . By the end of "Cool for You" you do feel as though you know Eileen Myles, and you're glad you took the time to listen to her story.

In The Boston Globe, Matthew Gilbert called Afterglow: A Dog Memoir, a book about Myles' pet pit bull Rosie,a challenging read that spirals up into big and little thoughts all inspired by her beloved companion, bringing in seemingly unrelated topics along the way such as the "self -war" of Kurt Cobain, libraries, gender identity, Abu Ghraib, George W. Bush's farts, and, at some length, sea foam. . .Myles writes that she doesn't want to stop talking to Rosie, that she has written the book, she says, "to keep talking to her." Luckily for us, we can eavesdrop on that long, wry, far-flung, and wonderfully loving conversation.

Fellowships, grants, awards

 New York State Creative Artist's Public Services Grant, (poetry) 1980  
 The National Endowment for the Arts (NEA) Performance/Inter-Arts Grant, (Modern Art) 1989  
 Fellow, Djerassi Foundation, 1994  
 Rex Foundation Grant, (The Grateful Dead) 1994  
 New York State Council on the Arts Theater Commission, with performer Carmelita Tropicana for Our Sor Juana, 1994 
 Ludwig Voegelstein Award, 1995  
 Franklin Furnace Performance Fund, 1995 
 The National Endowment for the Arts (NEA/CEC) ArtsLink Grant, 1995  
 The Fund for Poetry, 1988, 1990, 1996 
 Fellow, The Blue Mountain Arts Center, NY, 1997  
 Lambda Book Award, 1995, 1998  
 Bucknell Art Museum Residency, for Hide & Seek, 1998  
 New York Foundation for the Arts, poetry, 1999  
 Foundation for Contemporary Performance Touring Grant, 2001  
 Muir College Enrichment Grant, for Hell, 2004 
 Research and Travel Grant, University of California, San Diego, 2004  
 University of California Humanities Center Grant, for Hell, 2004  
 The University of California's Institute for Research in the Arts (UCIRA),for Hell, 2004  
 Warhol Foundation/Creative Capital, Arts Writers Grant, 2007  
 Fellow, The MacDowell Colony, 1991, 1996, 2009  
 Shelley Award, Poetry Society of America, 2010  
 Virginia Center for Creative Arts, Fellow, 2011 
 Lambda Book Award for Lesbian Fiction, (Inferno) 2011 
 Guggenheim Fellowship, Afterglow, (memoir), 2012
 Foundation for Contemporary Arts Grants to Artists award (2014)
 The Clark Prize for Excellence in Arts Writing, 2015
 Creative Capital Award, 2016
 Bill Whitehead Award, 2020

Bibliography

Poetry 
The Irony of the Leash. Jim Brodey Books, 1978.
Polar Ode (with Anne Waldman). New York: Dead Duke Books, 1979.
A Fresh Young Voice from the Plains. New York: Power Mad Press, 1981.
Sappho's Boat. Los Angeles: Little Caesar, 1982.
Not Me. New York: Semiotext(e), 1991.
Maxfield Parrish: Early and New Poems. Santa Rosa, California: Black Sparrow, 1995.
School of Fish, Santa Rosa, California: Black Sparrow Press, 1997.
Skies: Poems. Santa Rosa, California: Black Sparrow Press, 2001.
on my way. Cambridge, Massachusetts: Faux Press, 2001.
Tow (with drawings by artist Larry C. Collins). New York: Lospeccio Press, 2005.
Sorry, Tree (poems). Seattle: Wave Books, 2007.
Snowflake/different streets. Seattle: Wave Books, 2012.
I Must Be Living Twice: New and Selected Poems. Harper Collins, 2016.

Fiction 
 Bread and Water (stories). New York: Hanuman Books, 1986.
 1969 (fiction). New York: Hanuman Books, 1989.
 Chelsea Girls (fiction). Santa Rosa, California: Black Sparrow Press, 1994.
 Cool for You (novel). New York: Soft Skull Press, 2000.
Inferno (a poet's novel). New York: OR Books, 2010.

Non-fiction 

 The New Fuck You: adventures in lesbian reading (co-edited with Liz Kotz). New York: Semiotext(e), MIT Press, 1995.
 The Importance of Being Iceland (art writing). New York: Semiotext(e), MIT Press, 2009.
 Afterglow (a dog memoir). Grove Press, 2017.
Evolution. Grove Press, 2018.
For Now. Yale University Press, 2020.

Performances

In popular culture 
Their name appears in the lyrics of the Le Tigre song "Hot Topic."

The second season of the TV series Transparent featured a character based on Myles.

See also
 Lesbian Poetry

References

External links 

 
 
 "The Rumpus Interview with Poetry Rock Star Eileen Myles", December 2, 2009
 "An Icelandic Personal Culture: An Interview with Eileen Myles", 3:AM Magazine January 2, 2009
 Inferno, OR Books, 2010
 Eileen Myles's Author Page at Wave Books
 Eileen Myles' entry on PennSound
 The New York Times Review of Myles' Chelsea Girls and I Must Be Living Twice
 Audio Recording of Eileen Myles' Poetry Reading, 1992, from Maryland Institute College of Art's Decker Library, Internet Archive
Eileen Myles, the elevator, in: Camera Austria International 146 | 2019

1949 births
Living people
Lambda Literary Award for Lesbian Fiction winners
American lesbian writers
People from Arlington, Massachusetts
University of California, San Diego faculty
University of Massachusetts Boston alumni
Performance art in New York City
American LGBT poets
LGBT people from Massachusetts
American women poets
Lambda Literary Award for Lesbian Poetry winners
20th-century American poets
20th-century American women writers
21st-century American poets
21st-century American women writers
Lesbian memoirists
LGBT academics
Bard College faculty
Naropa University faculty
Washington University in St. Louis faculty
University of Montana faculty
Columbia University faculty
New York University faculty